"Fool" is a song by the English alternative rock band Mansun. The song was written by band-leader Paul Draper. It was recorded and produced by Hugh Padgham with co-producer Michael Hunter during sessions for the group's third studio album. The song was released as the third and final single in early 2001 from the group's third album, Little Kix. The single disappointed commercially reaching the low peak of #28 on the UK Singles Chart during the typically quiet post-Christmas singles market.

The music video for "Fool" was directed by Phil Harder.

Paul Draper was particularly dismissive of the track calling it his 'least favourite Mansun track'. Writing in the liner-notes to Legacy: The Best of Mansun, he describes "Fool" as an ironic song inspired by a book on songwriting by Jimmy Webb. The song played a part in further straining relations between Draper and the label: 'Bowie intro, comical chorus lyrics and guess what? The label (Parlophone) wanted it as a fucking single! I couldn't believe it.'

Track listing

Personnel

Mansun
 Paul Draper – lead vocals, acoustic guitar, keyboards
 Dominic Chad – electric guitar, backing vocals, piano
 Stove King – bass
 Andie Rathbone – drums, percussion

Production
 Hugh Padgham – producer ("Fool")
 Mike Hunter – producer (all tracks except "Fool"), engineering (all tracks except "Fool"), mixing (all tracks except "Fool"), co-producer ("Fool")
 Mark 'Spike' Stent – mixing ("Fool")
 Anton Corbijn – band photograph
 Alex Hutchinson (at Free Barrabas!) - design

Chart positions

References

2001 singles
2000 songs
Mansun songs
Songs written by Paul Draper (musician)
Song recordings produced by Hugh Padgham
Parlophone singles
Music videos directed by Phil Harder